is a city in Fukuoka Prefecture, Japan. Bordering Dazaifu, Onojo, Nakagawa, Saga Prefecture, Ogori, Yasu, and Chikuho, Fukuoka, Chikushino is essentially a southern suburb of Fukuoka City. It was founded on April 1, 1972.

As of September 30, 2016, the city had an estimated population of 103,076 and a population density of 1,174.92 persons per km². The total area is 87.73 km².

The Tenjin Ōmuta Line runs through Chikushino at Nishitetsu Futsukaichi Station, Murasaki Station (opened 2010), Asakuragaidō Station, Sakuradai Station and Chikushi. It has three stations on the Kagoshima Main Line, and the southern terminus of the Chikuho Main Line is at Haruda Station.

Education

Junior high schools
Chikushino
Chikuzan
South Chikushino
Futukaichi
Tenpai

High schools
Chikushi
Musashidai
Kyūshū Sangyō
Jōyō

Sightseeing

Futsukaichi Onsen
Mt. Houman and Tenpaizan
Tatsuiwa campsite

Commerce
Youme town
Beressa
Aeon mall

References

External links
 
 Chikushino City official website 

 
Cities in Fukuoka Prefecture